The 1993 NCAA Division I softball tournament was the twelfth annual tournament to determine the national champion of NCAA women's collegiate softball. Held during May 1993, twenty Division I college softball teams contested the championship. The tournament featured eight regionals of either two or three teams, each in a double elimination format. The 1993 Women's College World Series was held in Oklahoma City, Oklahoma from May 27 through May 31 and marked the conclusion of the 1993 NCAA Division I softball season.  Arizona won their second championship by defeating defending champions UCLA 1–0 in the final game.

Qualifying

Regionals

Regional No. 1

UCLA qualifies for WCWS, 2–0

Regional No. 2

Cal State Northridge qualifies for WCWS, 2–1

Regional No. 3

Arizona qualifies for WCWS, 2–0

Regional No. 4

Oklahoma State qualifies for WCWS, 2–0

Regional No. 5

First elimination round
 110,  0
Kansas 3,  1
Florida State 515, Iowa 3

Second elimination round

Florida State qualifies for WCWS, 3–1

Regional No. 6

First elimination round
 2, Connecticut 1
Connecticut 2,  1
UNLV 6, Hofstra 0

Second elimination round

Connecticut qualifies for WCWS, 3–1

Regional No. 7

First elimination round
 1,  0
 19, Sacramento State 0
Long Beach State 5, California 2

Second elimination round

Long Beach State qualifies for WCWS, 3–1

Regional No. 8

First elimination round
 7,  3
 8, Bowling Green 2
Southwestern Louisiana 6, Michigan 5

Second elimination round

Southwestern Louisiana qualifies for WCWS, 3–0

Women's College World Series

Participants
UCLA

Arizona

Connecticut

Game results

Bracket

Championship Game

All-Tournament Team
The following players were named to the All-Tournament Team

References

1993 NCAA Division I softball season
NCAA Division I softball tournament